Vereshchagino is the name of several inhabited localities in Russia.

Urban localities
Vereshchagino, Vereshchaginsky District, Perm Krai, a town in Vereshchaginsky District of Perm Krai

Rural localities
Vereshchagino, Kineshemsky District, Ivanovo Oblast, a village in Kineshemsky District of Ivanovo Oblast
Vereshchagino, Pestyakovsky District, Ivanovo Oblast, a village in Pestyakovsky District of Ivanovo Oblast
Vereshchagino, Puchezhsky District, Ivanovo Oblast, a village in Puchezhsky District of Ivanovo Oblast
Vereshchagino, Kirov Oblast, a village under the administrative jurisdiction of Oktyabrsky City District of the City of Kirov in Kirov Oblast; 
Vereshchagino, Krasnoyarsk Krai, a selo in Turukhansky District of Krasnoyarsk Krai
Vereshchagino, Lipetsk Oblast, a village in Krivetsky Selsoviet of Dobrovsky District in Lipetsk Oblast
Vereshchagino, Moscow Oblast, a village in Dorokhovskoye Rural Settlement of Orekhovo-Zuyevsky District in Moscow Oblast; 
Vereshchagino, Ochyorsky District, Perm Krai, a village in Ochyorsky District of Perm Krai
Vereshchagino, Vladimir Oblast, a village in Kameshkovsky District of Vladimir Oblast
Vereshchagino, Vologda Oblast, a village in Bechevinsky Selsoviet of Belozersky District in Vologda Oblast
Vereshchagino, Poshekhonsky District, Yaroslavl Oblast, a village in Leninsky Rural Okrug of Poshekhonsky District in Yaroslavl Oblast
Vereshchagino, Tutayevsky District, Yaroslavl Oblast, a selo in Nikolsky Rural Okrug of Tutayevsky District in Yaroslavl Oblast